Vilasco Fallet (born 27 January 1969) is an Ivorian footballer. He played in 13 matches for the Ivory Coast national football team from 1990 to 1994. He was also named in Ivory Coast's squad for the 1994 African Cup of Nations tournament.

References

External links
 
 

1969 births
Living people
Ivorian footballers
Ivory Coast international footballers
1994 African Cup of Nations players
Place of birth missing (living people)
Association football defenders
ASEC Mimosas players